The 1998 South African Figure Skating Championships were held in Cape Town from 5 to 10 October 1997. Skaters competed in the disciplines of men's and ladies' singles at the senior, novice, and pre-novice levels. There were also junior and juvenile ladies' competition.

Senior results

Men

Ladies

External links
 Results

South African Figure Skating Championships, 1998
South African Figure Skating Championships